Sekolah Jenis Kebangsaan (T) St. Teresa Convent school is a school in Perak, Malaysia.

SJK(T) St. Teresa Convent was founded in 1903 by a Sister Euphraise. Sister Euphraise was of Indian origin. She started teaching with eight students. She conducted her classes in a building behind the church of St. Louis. At that time, the school was the only Tamil school in Perak. Now the school has a total enrollment of 724 pupils with 39 teachers. The headmaster of the school is Mrs. P. Pushparani and PTA chairman is Mr. Ravindran.

External links 
 Sekolah Jenis Kebangsaan (T) St. Teresa Convent
 Facebook Sekolah Jenis Kebangsaan (T) St. Teresa Convent
 Upbeat mood as new wing opens

Christian schools in Malaysia
Schools in Perak
Educational institutions established in 1903
1903 establishments in British Malaya